The 2017 ICC World Cricket League Europe Region Division One was an international cricket tournament that took place in Netherlands in June 2017. The winner of the qualifier progressed to 2017 ICC World Cricket League Division Five which was staged in September 2017.

Teams 
Six teams invited by ICC for the tournament:

Points Table

References

External links
 Tournament homepage on ESPNcricinfo

2017–19 ICC World Cricket League
2017 in cricket